Nodes of Ranvier is a metalcore band from Sioux Falls, South Dakota, US, that was signed to Victory Records. The band is described as "one of Sioux Falls' most successful and popular acts ever." They have played with bands such as Bleeding Through, Every Time I Die, Bury Your Dead, Caliban, Comeback Kid, Norma Jean, Misery Signals, Extol and more across the US.
The band's name refers to the myelin sheath gaps which are also called Nodes of Ranvier.

History
Nodes of Ranvier was formed in September 2000 and has seen 18 different band members including Nick Thomas, the singer from the Sioux Falls band The Spill Canvas, as well as Brian Anderson, lead singer and guitarist from the band All About Sam. By December 2007, the time of the band's break-up, the only remaining original member was guitarist Jon Parker. The band released its first three albums through record label Facedown Records. In February 2007, they signed with Victory Records. Although the band's signing with Victory was touted as a turning point, their July 2007 release, Defined by Struggle, revealed strains between the band and Victory, who reportedly did not do much to promote them. In mid-December 2007, news sources confirmed that Nodes of Ranvier would perform its last show in the same month and then disband. Guitarist Jon Parker, one of the band's founding members, confirmed the announcement to media outlets, ending weeks of fan speculation. On January 24, 2017, it was announced by Facedown Records that the band would be reuniting for Facedown Fest 2017, the 20th anniversary of the label.

Discography
Studio albums
 Lost Senses, More Innocence (2002)
 Nodes of Ranvier (2003)
 The Years to Come (2005)
 Defined by Struggle (2007)
EPs
 Beauty with No Words (2001; Demo)
 Innocence Broken/Nodes of Ranvier (2002; Split EP w/ Innocence Broken)

Members
Current
 Jon Parker - guitars (2000-2008, 2017-present)
 Ryan Knutson - drums (2000-2006, 2017-present)
 Kyle Benecke - vocals (2006-2008, 2017-present)
 Scott McGuire - bass guitar (2017-present)
 Sheldon Swan - guitar (2017-present)

Former
 Jeremy Schwartz - bass guitar (2000-2001)
 Zachary "Add" Poppinga - guitars (2000-2003)
 Thomas Hentges - vocals (2000-2005) (Burlap The Wolf King)
 Jon Schuld - bass guitar (2001-2004)
 Nick Thomas - guitars, vocals (2003-2005) (The Spill Canvas)
 Nick Murphy - vocals (2005-2006), bass guitar (2004-2005) (Tennessee Murder Club)
 Jake Stefek - guitars (2004-2008)
 Terry Taylor - bass guitar (2005-2006) (Hammerlord, ex-The Blinding Light, ex-Suffer, ex-Caligari, ex-The Last Tyrant)
 Brady Murphy - bass guitar (ex-After the Sun) (2006-2008)
 Josh Ferrie - drums (2006-2008) (Suffer, Tennessee Murder Club, ex-Fall, ex-The Blinding Light, ex-The Thirty Fathom Grave)

Timeline

References

External links
 Nodes of Ranvier on Myspace

Musical groups established in 2000
Musical groups disestablished in 2007
Metalcore musical groups from South Dakota
American post-hardcore musical groups
Victory Records artists